Giradot F.C. was a  Colombian football (soccer) team, based in Girardot, Colombia. The club was founded in 1995 and played in Categoría Primera B. Due to financial difficulties, the team was relocated at the end of the 2008 season to the city of Palmira and rebranded as Deportes Palmira.

External links
 http://www.dimayor.com.co/Equipos/Girardot_FC_317-9618.html

Football clubs in Colombia
Association football clubs established in 1995
Association football clubs disestablished in 2008
Defunct football clubs in Colombia
1995 establishments in Colombia
2008 disestablishments in Colombia
Categoría Primera B clubs